Chad Beau Hampson (born March 31, 1988 in New Winthropes, Antigua)  is an Antiguan cricketer. who has played for both Leeward Islands cricket team in West Indian domestic cricket. He was named in Stanford Superstars in 2008.

References

External links
Player profile and statistics at CricketArchive
Player profile and statistics at ESPNcricinfo

1988 births
Leeward Islands cricketers
Antigua and Barbuda cricketers
Living people